The Men's 4x400m relay T53-54 for wheelchair athletes at the 2004 Summer Paralympics were held in the Athens Olympic Stadium on 27 September. The event consisted of 3 heats and a final. It was won by the team representing .

1st round

Heat 1
23 Sept. 2004, 12:20

Heat 2
23 Sept. 2004, 12:30

Heat 3
23 Sept. 2004, 12:40

Final round

24 Sept. 2004, 21:55

Team Lists

References

M